The 2009 TAC Cup season was the 18th season of the TAC Cup competition. Calder Cannons won their 5th premiership title after defeating the Dandenong Stingrays in the grand final by 14 points.

Ladder

Grand Final

References 

NAB League
Nab League